The Sucunduri State Forest is a state forest in the state of Amazonas, Brazil.

Location

The Sucunduri State Forest is in the municipality of Apuí, Amazonas.
It adjoins the Aripuanã Sustainable Development Reserve to the west, which lies on either side of the Aripuanã River.
To the south, the border with the state of Mato Grosso separates the forest from the Igarapés do Juruena State Park and the overlapping Juruena National Park. 
To the east the forest adjoins the Sucunduri State Park.
Part of the northern boundary separates it from the Jatuarana National Forest.

History

The park was created by Amazonas governor decree 24808 of 20 January 2005 with the objective of promoting sustainable multiple use of forest resources and scientific research with emphasis on methods of using native forest resources in a sustainable way.

Conservation

The forest is an integral part of the Apuí Mosaic, which totals  in area and contains the Guariba and Sucunduri State Parks; Bararati and Aripuana sustainable development reserves; Guariba Extractive Reserve; and Sucunduri, Aripuana, Apuí and Manicoré state forests.

Notes

Sources

2005 establishments in Brazil
State forests of Brazil
Protected areas of Amazonas (Brazilian state)
Protected areas established in 2005